Cooper-S is a cover album by noise rock band Feedtime, released in 1988 BY Rough Trade Records.

Track listing

Personnel 
Adapted from the Cooper-S liner notes.

feedtime
Rick Johnson – vocals, guitar
Al Larkin – bass guitar
Tom Sturm – drums, trumpet

Additional musicians and production
Blind Full Throttle – guitar (B7)
Dave – vocals (B1)
Adrian Hornblower – saxophone
Rhino – vocals (A7, A8)

Release history

References

External links 
 

1988 albums
Covers albums
Feedtime albums